Mohammed Ahmed Karam (born 1 January 1955) is a Kuwaiti football midfielder who played for Kuwait in the 1982 FIFA World Cup. He also played for Al-Arabi SC.

References

External links
FIFA profile

1955 births
Kuwaiti footballers
Kuwait international footballers
Association football midfielders
1982 FIFA World Cup players
Living people
1980 AFC Asian Cup players
1984 AFC Asian Cup players
AFC Asian Cup-winning players
Asian Games medalists in football
Footballers at the 1982 Asian Games
Asian Games silver medalists for Kuwait
Medalists at the 1982 Asian Games
Al-Arabi SC (Kuwait) players
Kuwait Premier League players